Singersville is an unincorporated community in Middle Paxton Township, Dauphin County, Pennsylvania, United States, situated in the Harrisburg–Carlisle metropolitan statistical area.

References

External links 
Singersville Profile

Harrisburg–Carlisle metropolitan statistical area
Unincorporated communities in Dauphin County, Pennsylvania
Unincorporated communities in Pennsylvania